Črni Vrh is a dispersed settlement in the Municipality of Tabor in central Slovenia. The area is part of the traditional region of Styria. The municipality is now included in the Savinja Statistical Region.

References

External links
Črni Vrh at Geopedia

Populated places in the Municipality of Tabor